Louise Katz is an Australian fantasy and science fiction novelist and academic.

Biography
Katz was born in Canberra, Australia, and attended art school in Adelaide. She is a Doctor of Creative Arts and has taught creative writing and academic writing at the University of Technology, Sydney and the University of Sydney.

In 1996 Katz' first book, Myfanwy's Demon, was published. Her second novel, The Other Face of Janus, was released in 2001; the book won the 2001 Aurealis Award for best young-adult novel. The Orchid Nursery from 2016 won the Norma K. Hemming award for that year. Katz has also published short fiction, including the short story "Weavers of the Twilight" which was a joint winner of the 2004 Aurealis Award for best fantasy short story.

Awards
 2001 – Aurealis award, for The Other Face of Janus
 2004 – Co-winner, Aurealis Award, for "Weavers of the Twilight"
 2016 – Winner, Norma K. Hemming  award, for The Orchid Nursery

Selected bibliography

Novels
 Myfanwy's Demon (1996) HarperCollins, 
 The Other Face of Janus (2001) HarperCollins, 
 The Orchid Nursery (2015) Lacuna Publishing,

Short fiction
 2004 "Weavers of the Twilight", short story, in Agog! Smashing Stories, Wollongong, Australia: Agog! Press
 2000 "The Little Demon", short story, in Mystery, Magic, Voodoo, Sydney: HarperCollins
 2009 "The Absent Men", novella, in X-6 Anthology, Sydney: Coeur de Lion Publishing

References

Living people
20th-century Australian novelists
21st-century Australian novelists
Australian women novelists
Australian women short story writers
Year of birth missing (living people)
Australian women children's writers
Writers from Canberra
20th-century Australian women writers
21st-century Australian women writers
20th-century Australian short story writers
21st-century Australian short story writers
University of Technology Sydney alumni